Wrestling, for the 2013 World Combat Games, was held at the St. Petersburg Sports and Concert Complex Hall 1, in Saint Petersburg, Russia. It started from 23 to 25 October 2013.

Medal table
Key:

Medal summary

Men

Women

References

2013 World Combat Games
2013 World Combat Games events
2013 in sport wrestling
International wrestling competitions hosted by Russia